Malargal (Tamil: மலர்கள், ) was an Indian Tamil-language soap opera which aired on Sun TV. It is a Prime time serial that aired weekdays from 17 October 2005 to June 2007. The show is aired in Sun TV every Monday to Friday at 7.30 pm.

The show starred Delhi Kumar, Chetan, Abishek Shankar, Rajkanth, Sulakshana, Meenakumari, Sabitha Anand, Azhagu, Deepak Dinkar, Sreekumar, Vaishnavi, Sri Vidya, Rindhiya, Deepa Shankar, Poovilangu Mohan, Shyam Ganesh, George Vishnu, Sureshwar, Nithya Ravindar, Sonia Bose, Sneha Eswar, Vasu Vikram, Dev Anand, Jayashree, Chithra, Kaveri, Aishwarya, Akhila, Srilekha Rajendran, 
Revathi Shankar, Vijay Krishnaraj, Kaveri Babu, Chandrabose, K. S. G. Venkatesh, V. C. Jeyamani, K. S. Jayalakshmi, Gauthami Vembunathan, Swetha Bharathi, Bhuvana, Hema, Vatsala Rajagopal, Karna, Rajkumar & Arun Prabu Purushothaman.

The show is produced by Cine Times Entertainment & directed by Badri & E. Vikkiramathithan. The show was later replaced by Megala which was also produced by Cine Times Entertainment.

Plot
The story evolves on the life of Nataraja Gounder along with wife Sivagami & his five children Thulasi, Moorthy, Bhaskar, Siva & Vidya. Nataraja Goundar is a kind hearted, respected farmer & meticulous family leader yet he is very compassionate father. It shows how he faces struggles & hardship in his as well as his children's lives in the form of fate & enmity with Kathirvel, Gnanavel & Pandithurai who holds grudge on Nataraja Goundar for various reasons & how he overcomes it.

Cast

 Delhi Kumar as Nataraja Goundar
 B. Murali as Young Nataraja Goundar
 Chetan as Kathirvel Goundar, Nataraja Goundar & Sivagami's foster son & Ganthimathi's biological son
 Abishek Shankar as Shanmugham, Nataraja Goundar & Sivagami's elder son-in-law & Thulasi & Poongothai's husband
 Rajkanth as Pandithurai "Pandi"
 Sulakshana as Sivagami, as Nataraja Goundar's wife 
 Meenakumari as Thulasi, Nataraja Goundar & Sivagami's elder daughter & Shanmugham's 1st wife
 Sabitha Anand as Ganthimathi, Nataraja Goundar's ex-lover & Kathirvel's biological mother 
 Unknown as Young Ganthimathi
 Azhagu as Gnanavel, Kathirvel's maternal uncle & Ganthimathi's brother
 Lingesawaran as Young Gnanavel
 Vidharth/Deepak Dinkar as Ramesh (James), Nataraja Goundar & Sivagami's younger son-in-law & Vidya's husband
 Dev Anand/Sreekumar as Ashok, Pandithurai's brother & Vidya's ex-lover
 Vaishnavi/Sri Vidya as Vidya, Nataraja Goundar & Sivagami's younger daughter & Ramesh's wife
 Rindhiya as Poongothai, Shanmugham's 2nd wife
 Deepa Shankar as Revathy, Nataraja Goundar & Sivagami's youngest daughter-in-law & Siva's 1st wife
 Poovilangu Mohan as Mohana Sundaram, Vidya's father-in-law & Ramesh & Ganesh's father
 George Vishnu/Shyam Ganesh as Moorthy, Nataraja Goundar's eldest son & Karpagam's husband
 Sureshwar as Bhaskar, Nataraja Goundar's middle son & Malliga's husband
 Nithya Ravindar as Sharadha, Vidya's mother-in-law & Ramesh & Ganesh's mother
 Sonia Bose as Karpagam, Nataraja Goundar's eldest daughter-in-law & Moorthy's wife
 Sneha Eswar (Sneha Nambiar) as Malliga as Nataraja Goundar & Sivagami's middle daughter-in-law & Bhaskar's wife
 Vasu Vikram as Sundaresan Goundar, Sivagami's brother & Revathi's father
 Unknown/Jayashree as Kavitha, Kathirvel's wife, Ganthimathi's daughter-in-law 
 Chithra as Indra Ramanathan as Kavitha, Prabha & Padmini's mother
 Kaveri as Padmini "Puppy" as Kavitha's elder sister
 Aishwarya as Prabha, Kavitha's younger sister
 Akhila as Amala, Nataraja Goundar & Sivagami's ex-daughter-in-law & Siva's ex-wife (2nd wife)
 Srilekha Rajendran as Moorthy's mother-in-law & Karpagam's mother
 Revathi Shankar as Bhaskar's mother-in-law & Malliga's mother
 Vijay Krishnaraj as Paramasivam, Moorthy's father-in-law & Karpagam's father 
 Kaveri Babu as Ramasamy, Bhaskar's father-in-law & Malliga's father
 Chandrabose as Sivalingam "Lingam"
 K. S. G. Venkatesh as Rajasekhar, Amala's father & Siva's ex-father-in-law 
 V. C. Jeyamani as Viswanathan, Thulasi & Poongothai's father-in-law & Shanmugham's father 
 K. S. Jayalakshmi as Sundari, Ramesh & Ganesh's paternal aunt & Dharshini's mother
 Gowthami Vembunathan as Saraswathi, Thulasi & Poongothai's mother-in-law & Shanmugham's mother
 Swetha Bharathi as Dharshini, Ramesh & Ganesh's paternal cousin
 Hema/Bhuvana as Valli, Pandithurai's wife
 Vatsala Rajagopal as Dhanavalli, Poongothai's foster grandmother
 Karna as Panneerselvam "Panneer", Ramesh & Ganesh's uncle & Dharshini's father
 Rajkumar as Siva, Nataraja Goundar & Sivagami's youngest son, Revathy's husband & Amala's ex-husband
 Arun Prabu Purushothaman (Arun Nepal) as Ganesh, Vidya's brother-in-law & Ramesh's brother
 T. S. Raghavendra as Palaniappan, Nataraja Goundar's friend & astrologer
 K. R. Selvaraj as Manohar, Shanmugham's maternal uncle & Saraswathi's brother
 Mythili as Vasuki as Palaniappan's wife
 Shobana as Valarmathi "Valar", Shanmugham's aunt Saraswathi's sister-in-law
 Manorama as Meenatchi Sr, Nataraja Goundar's mother
 Mohan Sharma as Jaya Prakash "JP"
 Meera Krishnan as Sangeetha
 Sathish as Meyyappan
 Vairavaraj as Perumalsamy
 Birla Bose as Saravana Kumar
 Parthan as Swaminathan
 Andrew Jesudoss as a jailer
 MLA Thangaraj as Saminathan, Nataraja Goundar's friend & farmer
 Soodhu Kavvum Sivakumar as Durai, Shanmugham's friend & colleague
 M. D. Mohan as Mani, Shanmugham's friend
 Sumathisri as Amutha, Siva & Amala's maid
 Usha Elizabeth Suraj as Uma, Durai' wife
 K. R. Vatsala as Sorna
 Rangammal as a midwife
 Cable Shankar as Shanmughanathan as Kathirvel's adopted father & Gnanavel's employer
 Auditor Sridhar as Aruncahalam
 Viji Kannan as Mudaliar's wife
 Vaani as Reddy's wife
 S. Ramakrishnan as Kavitha & Prabha's maternal uncle, Indra Ramanathan's cousin
 Baby Bharathi as Meenatchi Jr, Nataraja Goundar & Sivagami's granddaughter & Moorthy & Karpagam's daughter
 Master Vignesh as Karthik, Nataraja Goundar's grandson & Bhaskar & Malliga's son 
 S. R. Kaviya Varshini Arun as Shamini, Ramesh 's college mate
 S. Gokul Thilak
 L. Muthukumarasamy
 S. T. P. Rosary as Sadhasivam
 Chelladurai as a police constable
 Veera as a police constable
 Muralidhar Raj as Mads, Kavitha & Prabha's brother-in-law, Padmini's husband
 Adams as Siva's friend
 Jayasurya as Sekhar, Sivalingam's aide
 Dayalan as Kasi, Pandithurai's aide
 Srejeth as Santhanam, Mohana Sundaram's auditor's assistant
 Haaris as Ramesh's friend
 T. Deepa as Aasaithambi's wife
 Ramesh
 N. P. Jothi as Sivalingam's henchman
 Senthilvel as Sivalingam's henchman
 Jayanthi Shankar as Sharadha's relative
 C. Pauline as Shanmugham's  neighbour
 Pattukottai Sivanarayamoorthy special appearance in the title song
 Master Babur Siddique special appearance in the title song

Production

Filming
The series was filmed in Chennai, Poonamalee, Nazarethpettai, Gerugambakkam, Kovur, Porur, Kanchipuram, Valasaravakkam, Kundrathur, Peddapuram & Bangalore.

Soundtrack
The title song was composed by Vijay Antony, while the background score & the other songs were composed by Sanjeev Ratheen. Lyrics were written by Palani Bharathi.

Awards

References

Sun TV original programming
2000s Tamil-language television series
2005 Tamil-language television series debuts
Tamil-language television shows
2007 Tamil-language television series endings